Tagbilaran Cathedral, officially named as the Saint Joseph the Worker Cathedral - Shrine Parish, is a Roman Catholic cathedral church in Tagbilaran, capital city of Bohol province, in Central Visayas, Philippines. It is the seat of the Diocese of Tagbilaran which comprises Bohol's western half. The cathedral is located in Tagbilaran poblacion and was installed with a historical marker by the NHCP in 1953.

History
Tagbilaran is one of the six parishes founded in 1595 by the Jesuit missionaries in Bohol. In 1768, the parish administration was given to the Augustinian Recollects. The Jesuits built the original church which was razed by fire on December 23, 1798. Under the helm of Fr. Valero de San Pascual, the church was reconstructed and was enlarged from 1839 to 1855. The convent was built under Fr. Lucas Corominas while the tower was constructed under Fr. Jose Sancho from 1884 to 1888. The church premises was improved from 1884 to 1894 with the installation of iron cornices, tiles for flooring and chandeliers under Fr. Escolastico Enciso.

Between 1945 and 1951, reinforced concrete was used to replace the wooden flooring, original frescoes were removed, and permanent narra cornices were placed under Bishop Julio Rosales and Fr. Arturo Tecson. Under Bishop Manuel Mascariñas, Fr. Pedro Namoc and Fr. Between 1977 and 1989, the cathedral plaza was fenced with concrete, the convent and parish offices were extended, the cathedral was improved and repainted with its roofing totally changed, and the perpetual adoration chapel was constructed under Msgr. Pelagio Dompor. From 1991 to 1997, the cathedral grounds was beautified and landscaped, the stained glass windows were installed, the cathedral wings were built, the adoration chapel was renovated, the Saint Joseph the Worker Statue was installed at the church façade, the church portico façade was added, and the cement plaster on bell tower by Msgr. Cirilo D. Darunday Jr. Due to the 2013 Bohol earthquake, the exterior and interior of the cathedral had undergone major reconstructions, including the church's ceiling paintings.

Gallery

References

External links
 Facebook page 

Spanish Colonial architecture in the Philippines
Roman Catholic churches in Bohol
Roman Catholic cathedrals in the Philippines
1595 establishments in the Spanish Empire
18th-century Roman Catholic church buildings in the Philippines
Buildings and structures in Tagbilaran
Churches in the Roman Catholic Diocese of Tagbilaran